The U3 is a line of the Hamburg U-Bahn. The ring line with a length of  serves 25 stations. The first part opened in 1912. The line starts in Wandsbek-Gartenstadt and leads via Barmbek into the ring passing through the city center and back to Barmbek.

History 

The ring line was built from 1906 to 1912 and had a length of 17.48 km and with 23 stations. The first part of the line which was first opened in February 1912, was the part between Rathaus via Hauptbahnhof and to Barmbek. On 2 January 1967 the first part of the line to Billstedt opened with the section leading to Horner Rennbahn. Since then, the U3 line was not a ring line anymore until the year of 2009.

In 2009 eastern parts of U2 and U3 lines were swapped behind Berliner Tor. Before that, the U2 line led to Wandsbek-Gartenstadt. Since then, it ends in Mümmelmannsberg, and the U3 became a ring line again with a branch to Wandsbek-Gartenstadt.

Gallery

See also 
 Tokyo's Toei Ōedo Line, London Underground's Circle line, and the Brussels Metro Line 6, three underground lines with similar arrangements

References

External links 

Hamburg U-Bahn lines
Railway lines opened in 1912
1912 establishments in Germany
Railway loop lines